Children in Need 2009 was a campaign held in the United Kingdom to raise money for Children in Need. It culminated in a live broadcast on BBC One and ITV1 which began on the evening of Friday 20 November and ran through to the morning of Saturday 21 November. The broadcast was hosted by Terry Wogan, Tess Daly and Alesha Dixon. Alan Dedicoat read out the running totals and Peter André reported from the BT Tower. The show was broadcast from BBC Television Centre in London. Dancing Pudseys were projected on to the building. The 2009 event raised £20,309,747 by the end of the broadcast, slightly under the previous year's total of £20,991,216.

Television campaign

Artist performances
 Alesha Dixon opened the show with a performance of her single "The Boy Does Nothing", accompanied by the dancers from Strictly Come Dancing
 Peter Kay premièred the official single for Children in Need 2009, titled "The Official BBC Children in Need Medley".
 The X Factor 2008 runners-up JLS performed "Everybody in Love"
 John Barrowman performed a cover version of "Old Time Rock and Roll" in his boxers which he then signed and auctioned with all proceeds going to the cause.
 Taylor Swift performed "Love Story" before donating £13,000 towards the cause
 Westlife performed a cover version of "What About Now"
 Pixie Lott opened the second half of the show by performing her song "Boys and Girls"
 Justin Lee Collins performed a cover version of "Delilah"
 Gray O'Brien performed All I Care About from the musical Chicago
 Alesha Dixon performed "To Love Again"
 Harry Connick, Jr. performed "Just The Way You Are"
 David Gray and Annie Lennox performed a duet of Gray's upcoming single Full Steam
 Spandau Ballet performed their song "True"
 Madness performed a cover version of "It Must Be Love"
 Peter André performed "Unconditional"
 Paolo Nutini performed "Pencil Full of Lead" from Glasgow
 The Nolans performed a medley of songs including "Holding Out for a Hero", "It's Raining Men" and "I'm In the Mood for Dancing"
 Sugababes performed "About a Girl" from Belfast
 Paloma Faith performed "Stone Cold Sober"
 Stereophonics performed "Innocent" from Cardiff
 Ronan Keating performed "Homeward Bound" from Belfast
 Highlights from Belfast were shown, including Escala, Tinchy Stryder and N-Dubz
 Highlights from Cardiff were shown, including Bonnie Tyler and Only Men Aloud!
 Alison Moyet performed "Love Letters"
 Little Boots performed "Remedy" from Glasgow
 Robbie Williams performed "Bodies" and "You Know Me" from Reality Killed The Video Star

Cast performances
 The cast of Hollyoaks performed a Queen tribute
 The presenters and reporters from The One Show performed a Fame tribute
 The cast of The Bill performed "Mack the Knife"
 The cast of EastEnders performed a Motown tribute, which was shown twice during the broadcast. The tribute included covers of "Dancing in the Street", "Get Ready", "ABC" and "Ain't No Mountain High Enough"
 Carol Vorderman performed a Pop-rap tribute, which was shown twice during the broadcast. The tribute included covers of "Me Myself and I", "Doin' the Do", "Gone Till November" and "Last Night"
 Four female BBC Newsreaders (Sophie Raworth, Fiona Bruce, Susanna Reid and Kate Silverton) performed a medley of Beyoncé Knowles songs including "Crazy in Love" and "Single Ladies (Put a Ring on It)". They were then joined by four male newsreaders (Charlie Stayt, Ben Brown, Bill Turnbull and Nicholas Owen) for a dance off against Diversity. During the second half of the television broadcast a behind the scenes video was shown of the rehearsals before a repeat of the dance itself
 The cast of Legally Blonde performed a selection of songs from the musical
 The cast of Priscilla Queen of the Desert - the Musical performed a selection of songs from the musical
 The cast of Jersey Boys performed a selection of songs from the musical
 The cast of Avenue Q performed a special version of "The Money Song" from the musical

Others

Celebrity Mastermind
During the break for the BBC News at Ten on BBC One, BBC Two broadcast a special edition of Mastermind with comedians Lucy Porter, Mark Watson, Dave Spikey and Stephen K. Amos as contestants. Lucy Porter was the eventual winner, with a Celebrity Mastermind record score of 35 points.

Around the World in 80 Days 

As a prequel to the main televised event, a weekly television series began airing on 13 October 2009, where various celebrities attempted to travel around the world in 80 days without using air travel.

Children in Need Rocks the Royal Albert Hall 
Held on 12 November, Children in Need Rocks the Royal Albert Hall was an evening of live music in London's Royal Albert Hall, organised by Gary Barlow. The concert included sets by Sir Paul McCartney, Cheryl Cole, Katherine Jenkins, Julian Lloyd Webber, Leona Lewis, Robbie Williams, Lily Allen, MIKA, Dizzee Rascal, Muse, Dame Shirley Bassey, Snow Patrol and Take That, and was hosted by Chris Moyles. The event raised over two million pounds for the campaign. The event climaxed with all the artists collaborating onstage to perform "Hey Jude", by The Beatles.

Mascots
Pudsey Bear returned in the same style as has been seen since 2007. A new female character, Blush, was introduced. She is shyer than Pudsey, and wears a bow with the 2007 onwards Pudsey pattern.

Pudsey Bear lights up the BT Tower
Pudsey appeared at the top of the BT Tower in London on a giant 360-degree LED display. Pudsey popped up every half-hour, (between 07.00 - midnight) on 19 and 20 November.

Official single

Peter Kay co-ordinated the official single, following his work for Comic Relief. He worked with the cooperation of stars from some of the most popular children's television shows from around the world. The song is a mash-up of many pop songs throughout the years including; "Can You Feel It", "Don't Stop", "Jai Ho (You Are My Destiny)", "Tubthumping", "Never Forget", "Hey Jude" and "One Day Like This". The song reached #1 on the UK Singles Chart.

Other activities 

As in previous years, the TV show Countryfile sold a calendar in aid of the appeal. In 2009, it raised £750,000.

Totals
The following are totals with the times they were announced on the televised show.

See also
 Children in Need
 Pudsey Bear

References

External links
 Children in Need website
 Pudsey's behind the scenes Twitpic feed

2009 in British television
2009 in the United Kingdom
2009
November 2009 events in the United Kingdom